The Commission on Rhodesian Opinion, also known as the Pearce Commission, was a British commission set up in 1971 by Foreign and Commonwealth Secretary Sir Alec Douglas-Home to test the acceptability of a proposed constitutional settlement in Rhodesia. The commission was popularly known after as the Pearce Commission after its chairman, retired British judge Edward Pearce, Baron Pearce. The Pearce Commission reported in 1972 that although the European, Coloured, and Asian communities of Rhodesia were in favour of the proposals, the African population rejected them.

Background 
The commission was established on 25 November 1971, pursuant to the terms of the Proposals for Settlement agreed between the British and Rhodesian governments on 21 November 1971. The settlement recognised Rhodesia's 1969 constitution as the legal frame of government, while agreeing that gradual legislative representation was an acceptable formula for unhindered advance to majority rule. Nevertheless, the new settlement, if approved, would also implement an immediate improvement in black political status, offer a means to terminate racial discrimination, and provide a solid guarantee against retrogressive constitutional amendments.

Members

Chairman 

 Lord Pearce

Deputy Chairmen 

 Lord Harlech
 Sir Maurice Dorman
 Sir Glyn Jones
 Sir Frederick Pedler (withdrew on personal grounds on 7 January 1972)

Commissioners 

 D. Blain
 G. R. B. Blake, OBE
 J. E. Blunden
 J. H. Burges
 P. L. Burkinshaw, OBE
 I. E. Butler
 T. H. R. Cashmore
 A. F. Dawkins (1916-2009), schoolmaster and uncle of Richard Dawkins.
 F. W. Essex, CMG
 D. F. H. H. Frost, MBE
 Miss Freda H. Gwilliam, CBE
 J. L. S. Harrison
 J. F. Hayley, OBE
 P. A. Large
 J. D. Massingham
 M. Patey, MBE
 C. G. C. Rawlins, DFC, OBE
 J. C. Strong
 A. St. John Sugg, CMG
 A. H. Whitfield
 R. M. Allen (Statistician)

Secretariat 

 H. Smedley, CMG, MBE (Secretary-General)
 J. R. L. G. Varcoe (Deputy Secretary-General)
 B. E. Pauncefort (Assistant Secretary-General (Press))
 A. B. Gundersen (Assistant Secretary)
 A. Fayle (Administrative Officer)

References

Report 

 Rhodesia: Report of the Commission on Rhodesian Opinion Under the Chairmanship of the Right Honourable the Lord Pearce. London: His Majesty's Stationery Office. 1972. Cmnd. 4964.

Secondary literature 

 
 
 

1971 establishments in the United Kingdom
1972 disestablishments in the United Kingdom
Rhodesia–United Kingdom relations
1972 in Rhodesia
Organizations established in 1971
Alec Douglas-Home